Zhivko Gospodinov Gospodinov (6 September 1957 – 4 May 2015) was a Bulgarian footballer. Gospodinov was an attacking midfielder and playmaker. In his 18-year-long playing career, he played for Spartak Varna, Vatev Beloslav, Spartak Pleven, AD Fafe, Cherno More Varna and Beroe Stara Zagora.

He played with Spartak Varna and earned 155 caps in the Bulgarian A Professional Football Group.
Gospodinov played for Bulgaria national football team (39 caps/6 goals) and was a participant at the 1986 FIFA World Cup.

References

1957 births
Bulgarian footballers
1986 FIFA World Cup players
Bulgaria international footballers
PFC Spartak Varna players
PFC Spartak Pleven players
AD Fafe players
PFC Cherno More Varna players
PFC Beroe Stara Zagora players
First Professional Football League (Bulgaria) players
Bulgarian expatriates in Portugal
People from Dobrich
2015 deaths
Association football midfielders
Sportspeople from Varna, Bulgaria